Eran Sela (born March 10, 1985) is an Israeli Olympic sailor, sailing in the 470 discipline. His current partner is Gideon Kliger.

Early life
Sela was born in Hadera and resides in the kibbutz Sdot Yam. His father works at sea-craft maintenance and gives oceanic services, while his mother works at Caeserstone. He has two siblings, Roi, who works on a project relating to ships and Ofri, who worked as a skipper assistant.

In the army, he served at the Flotilla base in Atlit as an "exceptional sportsman".

Career
Sela is a member of the Sdot Yam Yacht Club, where he began sailing when he was 14 on a 420 dinghy and then switched to a 470 dinghy. In the European Junior Championship in Hungary in 2004, he won a bronze medal. He was twice the Israeli national champion, and three times the runner-up.

His first partner was Aviv Ben-Hurin, and afterwards Yogev Yosef, both of them from Sdot Yam. In 2009, he competed with Yosef for a ticket to the 2012 Summer Olympics against Udi Gal and Gideon Kliger but placed low.

He quit sailing following financing problems, and coached for 1.5 years. Gal and Kliger broke up their partnership after Gal retired from sailing, and Kliger joined Sela. After a month of training, the duo finished third place in the Rolex Cup in Miami.

In March 2010, they placed first in the Israeli Championships, and won a silver medal in the same year 470 European Championships in Istanbul.

In 2011, they won a bronze medal in the 470 European Championships in Helsinki. Afterwards, they won a bronze medal in the Olympic Test Event at Weymouth, which gave them the Israeli Olympic criteria. In the 2011 ISAF Sailing World Championships, held in Perth, they finished 4th place and qualified for the 2012 Summer Olympics.

In 2012 they won a silver medal at the ISAF Sailing World Cup in Palma. From then they have been in a decline, only reaching 8th place at the 2012 470 World Championships and 15th place at the 2012 Summer Olympics.

References

External links
 

1985 births
Living people
Israeli Jews
Israeli male sailors (sport)
Jewish sailors (sport)
Olympic sailors of Israel
Sailors at the 2012 Summer Olympics – 470
People from Hadera